This is a list of Australian Ice Hockey League seasons since inception of the league:

2000 | 
2001 |
2002 |
2003 |
2004 |
2005 |
2006 |
2007 |
2008 |
2009 |
2010 |
2011 |
2012 |
2013 |
2014 |
2015 |
2016 |
2017 |
2018 |
2019 |
2020 |
2021 |
2022 |

See also

External links
AIHL official site
Ice Hockey Australia

Australian Ice Hockey League seasons
Ice hockey seasons
Seasons, AIHL